Ballinger is a city in Runnels County, Texas, United States. The population was 3,767 at the 2010 census. It is the county seat of Runnels County. Downtown Ballinger features historic 1800s buildings with shops and restaurants.

Geography

Ballinger is located at  (31.7409, –99.9538). It is located in the transition zone from the Edwards Plateu to the Texas Southern Plains region of West Texas.

Demographics

2020 census

As of the 2020 United States census, there were 3,619 people, 1,449 households, and 860 families residing in the city.

2000 census
As of the census of 2000, 4,243 people, 1,578 households, and 1,093 families resided the city. The population density was 1,266.7 people per square mile (489.0/km2). The 1,879 housing units averaged 560.9 per square mile (216.6/km2). The racial makeup of the city was 79.68% White, 2.14% African American, 0.71% Native American, 0.45% Asian, 14.52% from other races, and 2.50% from two or more races. Hispanics or Latinos of any race were 31.28% of the population.

Of 1,578 households, 33.1% had children under the age of 18 living with them, 53.0% were married couples living together, 11.6% had a female householder with no husband present, and 30.7% were not families. About 28.6% of all households were made up of individuals, and 17.1% had someone living alone who was 65 years of age or older. The average household size was 2.53 and family size was 3.10.

In the city, the population was distributed as 26.9% under the age of 18, 6.4% from 18 to 24, 25.5% from 25 to 44, 21.0% from 45 to 64, and 20.2% who were 65 years of age or older. The median age was 38 years. For every 100 females, there were 88.3 males. For every 100 females age 18 and over, there were 80.9 males.

The median income for a household in the city was $26,129, and for a family was $31,393. Males had a median income of $24,207 versus $18,951 for females. The per capita income for the city was $11,917. About 14.3% of families and 17.2% of the population were below the poverty line, including 18.1% of those under age 18 and 25.0% of those age 65 or over.

Education
The city is served by the Ballinger Independent School District and is home to the Ballinger High School Bearcats.

Notable people

 David W. Guion, a widely performed classical composer and arranger of American folk music
 Hal Underwood, a professional golfer, won the European Tour

Sports

Ballinger was home of the minor league baseball team the Ballinger Cats from the 1920s to its disbandment in the late 1950s. They were affiliated with the Cincinnati Reds from 1947 to 1950, as well with the bygone St. Louis Browns in the 1930s and early 1940s.

Climate
The climate in this area is characterized by hot, humid summers and generally mild to cool winters.  According to the Köppen climate classification system, Ballinger has a humid subtropical climate, Cfa on climate maps.

References

External links

City of Ballinger official website
Entry for William P. Ballinger, for whom Ballinger was named, from the Biographical Encyclopedia of Texas published 1880, hosted by the Portal to Texas History.

Cities in Texas
Cities in Runnels County, Texas
County seats in Texas